is a Japanese former footballer.

Career statistics

Club

Notes

References

1988 births
Living people
Waseda University alumni
Japanese footballers
Association football forwards
Club Guaraní players
Club Olimpia footballers
Albirex Niigata Singapore FC players
Singapore Premier League players
Segunda Divisão players
Japanese expatriate sportspeople in Paraguay
Expatriate footballers in Paraguay
Japanese expatriate sportspeople in Singapore
Expatriate footballers in Singapore
Japanese expatriate sportspeople in Portugal
Expatriate footballers in Portugal